The 1987 United Kingdom general election in England was held on 11 June 1987 for 523 English seats to the House of Commons. The Conservative Party won an overall majority of English seats for the third successive election and enough seats to seal a UK-wide majority already within England's borders. 326 was the UK-wide threshold and the Conservatives won 358 in the English constituencies.

Results table

References

England
1987 in England
General elections in England to the Parliament of the United Kingdom